James or Jim Blake may refer to:

Entertainment
 James W. Blake (1862–1935), American lyricist
 James Blake (pianist) (1922–1979), British-American jazz musician
 James Carlos Blake (born 1947), American writer, winner of Los Angeles Times Book Prize for fiction, 1997
 James Blake (musician) (born 1988), British singer-songwriter
 James Blake (album), self-titled debut album
 Eubie Blake (James Hubert Blake, 1887–1983), American musician
 Jim Blake, character in the film Across the Plains (1928)

Politics
 James H. Blake (1768–1819), American politician, mayor of Washington, D.C.
 Jim Blake (Australian politician) (1921–2010), member of the Queensland Legislative Assembly
 James B. Blake (1827–1870), American politician, mayor of Worcester, Massachusetts

Other uses
 James "Spanish" Blake (died 1635), Irish Nine Years' War figure
 James Henry Blake (1808–1874), Boston Police Marshal in 1840
 James Vila Blake (1842–1925), American Unitarian minister, essayist, playwright and hymn writer and poet
 James F. Blake (1912–2002), American bus driver defied by Rosa Parks
 Ronald James Blake (born 1934), aka James Blake, British civil engineer in Hong Kong, CEO of KCRC
 James Blake (tennis) (born 1979), American professional tennis player
 James Blake House, oldest house in Boston

Blake, James